Taringa is a suburb in the City of Brisbane, Queensland, Australia.

Geography

The suburb of Taringa borders Brisbane's Mt Coot-Tha, Indooroopilly and St Lucia, and is dominated by a ridge that runs the length of Swann Road, with steep slopes on either side of the ridge.

Taringa is mostly residential, except for a small number of commercial buildings mostly clustered along Moggill Road. It is a popular neighbourhood among the students of the University of Queensland and the Queensland University of Technology because of its proximity to the universities and to Brisbane CBD.

History 
The name Taringa is a combination of two Aboriginal words: tarau (stones) and nga (made up of). Together, they mean "place of stones".

The Main Line railway from Roma Street railway station to Indooroopilly railway station opened on 14 June 1875 with the area being served by West Milton railway station (as it was initially known) before being renamed Taringa later that year.

In August 1886 auctioneer John W. Todd offered 32 buildings sites (all  or larger) in the Belgrave and Riverview Estate in "South Toowong". The estate was bounded by Swan Road to the north, Indooroopilly Road to the east, Todd Street to the south, and Kobada Street to the west.

On 19 March 1887 auctioneer R.J. Cottell offered suburban lots in the Taringa Township, which was along Harrys Road between Stanley Terrace and present-day Moggill Road.

In 1891, a Baptist church opened in Taringa.

Taringa State School opened on 8 October 1900 and closed on 14 December 1996. The school was located between Moggill Road and Morrow Street.

On Saturday 20 June 1908, Venerable H.F Le Fanu, Anglican Archdeacon of Brisbane laid the foundation stone and performed a stump capping ceremony for St Paul's Anglican Church. It was at 165 (approx) Moggill Road (on the present site of Taringa Central complex). It closed circa 1982-1986 and was removed.

The Lionel Brand of Worcestershire sauce was manufactured in Taringa.

On 3 December 1933, the Montrose Home for Crippled opened in Montrose, the home of Presbyterian philanthropist George Marchant which he donated for the purpose. The house was on a  site at 180-200 Swann Road, extending back to Seven Oaks Street. When the home needed larger premises, in 1937, Marchant purchased Ardeyne, a  site in Corinda for the long-term operation of the home under the management of the Queensland Society for Crippled Children. The home closed in 2001 as the organisation transitioned away from institutional care towards community and in-home support services. The home had its own school. The Montrose Home School for Crippled Children opened in January 1934 in Taringa. In March 1934 it was renamed Montrose Special School. It relocated with the home to Coarinda. The school closed on 2 June 2006. The home and school were at 54 Consort Street in Corinda.

Gailey Road is named after Richard Gailey an Irish-Australian architect.

The median age of the Taringa population was 29 years, 8 years below the Australian median.  63.8% of people living in Taringa were born in Australia, compared to the national average of 69.8%; the next most common countries of birth were England 3.8%, China 3%, New Zealand 2.4%, Malaysia 2.1%, India 2%.  75.9% of people spoke only English at home; the next most common languages were 3.6% Mandarin, 1.6% Cantonese, 1.3% Malay, 1.1% Spanish, 0.9% Persian (excluding Dari).

Heritage listings

Taringa has a number of heritage-listed sites, including:

 17 Darvall Street: Edge Hills (Federation-era house)
 26 Darvall Street: Au-Argentum (California Bungalow style house)
 29 Ellerslie Crescent: Laurel Bank (also known as St. Pauls' Court)
 4 Frederick Street, Taringa: Taringa Masonic Hall
 69 Hillsdon Road: Daheim (Federation-era house)
 79 Hillsdon Road: Hillsdon Road Kindergarten
 209 Indooroopilly Road: Fulton Residence
 20 Morrow Street: Interwar Old English house
 42 Oxford Terrace: Victorian-era cottage
 103 Stanley Terrace: Pilot Officer Geoffrey Lloyd Wells Memorial Seat
 178 Stanley Terrace: Federation-era house
 163 Swann Road: Rothley (Arts and Crafts style house)

Education 
There are no government schools in Taringa. The nearest primary schools are Toowong State School in neighbouring Toowong to the north, Ironside State School in neighbouring St Lucia to the east, and Indooroopilly State School in neighbouring Indooroopilly to the south-west. The nearest government secondary school is Indooroopilly State High School in Indooroopilly.

The Japanese Language Supplementary School of Queensland Japanese School of Brisbane (ブリスベン校 Burisuben Kō), a weekend Japanese school, maintains its school office in Taringa. It holds its classes at Indooroopilly State High School in Indooroopilly.

Community groups
The Taringa Scout Den is the home of the Taringa-Milton-Toowong Scout Group. It is also used as a GoJu Karate training facility and for Yoga.

Sport 
Taringa is the home of the Taringa Rovers Soccer Football Club, who play in the Brisbane Premier League.

Transport 
By Train, Taringa railway station is part of the Queensland Rail City network, on the Ipswich, Rosewood and Springfield railway lines providing travel to the Brisbane CBD, Ipswich, Rosewood and Springfield.

By Bus, Taringa is serviced by Brisbane Transport buses to the Brisbane CBD, Chancellor's Place at UQ St Lucia, Indooroopilly, Long Pocket, Chapel Hill and Kenmore.

By Road, Taringa's main thoroughfares are Swann Road and Moggill Road.

Notable people 
Gwen Harwood, an Australian poet, was born in Taringa.
 Dorothy Hill, geologist and palaeontologist, the first female professor at an Australian university, and the first female president of the Australian Academy of Science was born in Taringa in 1907.
 Frank William Moorhouse, born in Taringa, Chief Inspector of the Fisheries and Game Department of South Australia from 1936 to 1959.
Clement Lindley Wragge, a meteorologist, lived in Taringa in a house named Capemba in the 1890s.

References

External links

 
Taringa Neighbourhood Group

 
Suburbs of the City of Brisbane